Kwaku Afriyie is a Ghanaian politician, farmer and a member of the New Patriotic Party in Ghana. He was  the Western Regional minister of Ghana from 2017 to 2018. He was appointed by President Nana Addo Danquah Akuffo-Addo in January 2017 and was approved by the Members of Parliament in February 2017.

Early life and education 
Kwaku Afriyie was born on July 7, 1954 at Sefwi Wiawso. He has an MB CBH from the University of Ghana Medical School and a Master of Public Health from Tulane University, New Orleans, U.S. He was also a fellow of Ghana College of Physicians and Surgeons.

References

New Patriotic Party politicians
Western Region (Ghana)
People from Western Region (Ghana)
Ghanaian MPs 2021–2025
1954 births
Living people